Hymenobacter psychrotolerans  is a bacterium from the genus of Hymenobacter which has been isolated from permafrost sediments from the Qinghai-Tibet Plateau in China.

References

External links
Type strain of Hymenobacter psychrotolerans at BacDive -  the Bacterial Diversity Metadatabase	

psychrotolerans
Bacteria described in 2008